Henri Bachet (born 22 November 1906, date of death unknown) was a French sailor. He competed in the 8 Metre event at the 1936 Summer Olympics.

References

External links
 

1906 births
Year of death missing
French male sailors (sport)
Olympic sailors of France
Sailors at the 1936 Summer Olympics – 8 Metre
Place of birth missing